The following is a list of awards and nominations received by American actress Mila Kunis.

Major associations

Critics' Choice Movie Awards

Golden Globe Awards

Screen Actors Guild Awards

Other awards and nominations

Annie Awards

Dallas–Fort Worth Film Critics Association

Golden Raspberry Awards

Jupiter Awards

MTV Movie and TV Awards

Oklahoma Film Critics Circle

Online Film Critics Society

People's Choice Awards

Rembrandt Awards

Saturn Awards

Scream Awards

Spike Guys' Choice Awards

Spike Video Game Awards

Teen Choice Awards

Venice Film Festival

Young Artist Award

Notes

References

External links
 

Kunis, Mila